Zozu is an alcoholic beverage similar to a beer and locally made by the Zomi (the Zo people), in northwestern Myanmar (Chin State, Myanmar). This fermented alcohol is usually made with maize, rice or other grains that are available.

"Zozu The Robot" is a children's book by Diana Carter.

References

Burmese cuisine
Types of beer